Dmitri Rodionovich Arslanov (born 10 February 1990) is a former Russian professional football player.

Club career
He played in the Kazakhstan Premier League for FC Kyzylzhar in 2009.

External links
 
 Career summary by sportbox.ru
 

1990 births
People from Orenburg Oblast
Living people
Russian footballers
Russia youth international footballers
Association football midfielders
PFC CSKA Moscow players
FC Kyzylzhar players
Kazakhstan Premier League players
Russian expatriate footballers
Expatriate footballers in Kazakhstan
FC Nosta Novotroitsk players
Sportspeople from Orenburg Oblast
20th-century Russian people
21st-century Russian people